McDougald is a surname. Notable people with the surname include:

Elise Johnson McDougald (1885-1971), American educator, writer, and activist
Gil McDougald (1928–2010), American baseball player
John A. McDougald (1908–1978), Canadian businessman and racehorse owner
John McDougald (1848–1919), Canadian merchant and politician
Junior McDougald (born 1975), American-born English footballer
Roman McDougald (1907–1960), American writer
Wilfrid Laurier McDougald (1881–1942), Canadian senator
Worth McDougald (1925–2007), American academic

See also
McDougald Township, Lake of the Woods County, Minnesota
McLendon–McDougald Gymnasium, sports venue in North Carolina, United States